Kandlakoya is a village in Medchal district in Telangana, India. It falls under Medchal mandal. There is a junction of Outer Ring Road, Hyderabad passing through the village. Kandlakoya is 11 km from Suchitra Center and 6 km from Kompally Cross Roads.  Sai Geetha Ashram is also located here.

Educational institutions
Siva Sivani Public School is located here. CMR College of Engineering & Technology, CMR Institute Of Technology, CMR Technical Campus a UGC Autonomous Institution, CMR Engineering college and CMR College of Pharmacy are located here.

Commercial area
Kandlakoya is home to many warehouses since it is close to Outer Ring Road.

Information Technology is another sector in which the city is making steady progress with Gateway IT Park.

References

Villages in Ranga Reddy district